Bada Dosth (transl. Big Friend) is a 2006 Indian Malayalam-language action thriller film directed by Viji Thampi and produced by Siddique. The film stars Suresh Gopi,  Siddique, Jyothirmayi and Manoj K. Jayan in lead roles. The film had a musical score by M. Jayachandran. The film was released on October 20 on the Eve of Diwali.

Plot 
This movie is the story about Daya Shankar (also called as Bada Dhosth), an efficient and daring IPS officer, famous for his gutsy actions against violence. His life takes an untoward turn when he come across a gangster Geevarghese a.k.a. G. V.

Cast
 Suresh Gopi as Commissioner Daya Shankar IPS / Bada Dosth
 Siddique as Geevarghese/GV
 Manoj K. Jayan as Commissioner Zakeer Ali IPS
 Cochin Haneefa as Javed 
 Jyothirmayi as Meenakshi Daya Shankar
 Karthika Mathew as Nadira Hassan
 Meghna Naidu as Nanditha Menon
 Manikuttan as Nandu
 Devan as Home Minister Kannoth Divakaran (K.D)
 Riyaz Khan as CI Niranjan Das
 Rizabawa as Raveendranath Khurana

References

External links
 
 

2006 films
2000s Malayalam-language films
Films directed by Viji Thampi